Boleslovas Klova  (1927–1986) was a Lithuanian painter.

See also
List of Lithuanian painters

References
Universal Lithuanian Encyclopedia

1927 births
1986 deaths
20th-century Lithuanian painters